The  is a railway line in Japan operated by Kyushu Railway Company (JR Kyushu). It connects Saitozaki Station in Fukuoka with Umi Station in Umi.

Stations

History
The Hakata Bay Railway Co. opened the Saitozaki - Sue section in 1904, extending it to the Otani coal mine (1 km beyond Umi) the following year. In 1942, the company merged with the Nishi-Nippon Railroad company, which was nationalised in 1944.

The line beyond Umi closed in 1980.

Former connecting lines
Sakado station - The 14 km Katsuta line was opened by the Chikuzen Sangu Railway Co. from Yusu (on the Sasaguri Line) - Chikuzenkatsuta in 1918-19. The connection to Sakado opened in 1942, and the line was nationalised in 1944. Freight service ceased in 1981, and the line closed in 1985.

References

Lines of Kyushu Railway Company
1067 mm gauge railways in Japan